Maganti Ankineedu (born 1 January 1915, date of death 8 September 2008) was an Indian independence activist, politician and Member of parliament, Lok Sabha.

He was born to Maganti Venkata Ramdas at Tamirisa village, Krishna district. He was educated at Hindu College, Machilipatnam.

He participated in the Indian independence movement and imprisoned twice during the Civil Disobedience Movement and the Quit India Movement.

He was elected to 3rd Lok Sabha,4th Lok Sabha, 5th Lok Sabha,from Gudivada constiturncy and  6th Lok Sabha and 7th Lok Sabha from Machilipatnam constituency as a member of Indian National Congress in 1962,1967,1972,1977 and 1980 respectively.

Family
He is the uncle of Telugu film actor Venu Thottempudi

References

External links
 Maganti Ankineedu Biodata at Lok Sabha website.

Telugu politicians
1915 births
Year of death missing
Indian independence activists from Andhra Pradesh
India MPs 1962–1967
India MPs 1967–1970
India MPs 1971–1977
India MPs 1977–1979
India MPs 1980–1984
Lok Sabha members from Andhra Pradesh
People from Krishna district
Indian National Congress politicians from Andhra Pradesh